The Renault Trucks C is a range of medium duty/high duty trucks for construction manufactured by the French truckmaker Renault Trucks and introduced in 2013.

Characteristics
The Renault Trucks C incorporates a temporary hydrostatic traction system in its front axle (Optitrack). It also adds new comfort and security features.

Engines
The  C offers three Euro 6 engines, the 8 L DTI 8 (with a power output of 250, 280 and 320  hp) the 11 L DTI 11 (380, 430 and 460 hp) and the 13 L DTI 13 (440, 480 and 520 hp).

References

C
Vehicles introduced in 2013